Benjamin Bley de Brito Neves (born 1941) is a Brazilian geologist who has contributed to the paleogeography and plate tectonics of South America. Brito Neves is member of Sociedade Brasileira de Geologia,
National Water Well Association and the Geological Society of America. He is member of the Brazilian Academy of Sciences.

References

20th-century Brazilian geologists
Tectonicists
Living people
Academic staff of the University of São Paulo
Federal University of Pernambuco alumni
Members of the Brazilian Academy of Sciences
Sudene personnel
1941 births
Place of birth missing (living people)